Judge Field may refer to:

John A. Field Jr. (1910–1995), judge of the United States Court of Appeals for the Fourth Circuit
Richard Stockton Field (1803–1870), judge of the United States District Court for the District of New Jersey